Otter Creek in Ontario, Canada may refer to:

Otter Creek, Bruce County, Ontario
Otter Creek, Hastings County, a settlement in Hastings County
Otter Creek (Hastings County), a creek in Hastings County